Richard Cumberland may refer to:
 Richard Cumberland (philosopher) (1631–1718), bishop, philosopher
 Richard Cumberland (dramatist) (1732–1811), civil servant, dramatist
 Richard Cumberland (priest) (1710–1737), Archdeacon of Northampton, 1707–1737